There are several places called Willoughby Bay. These include:

Willoughby Bay, adjacent to Willoughby Spit, Virginia, United States
Willoughby Bay (Antigua)